Bedara Vesha is a folk dance performed days before Holi night in Sirsi town of Karnataka. It is also known as ‘Hunter Dance’. People of Sirsi celebrate Holi with this unique folk dance every alternate year. It attracts a large crowd from different parts of the state on all the five days of Holi.

How is it done?
The Hunter Dance is practiced for months before the actual performance. The artists are donned with peacock feathers, mustache, cotton and red cloth, fruits, shield and sword.
Two ropes are tied to the belly of the performer and two people will hold the ropes to his back of that gigantic bundle of peacock feathers, depicting to stop the Malleshi from killing the people who come in his place. The dance will be supported by the hand drum(Tamate) players to give a rhythm to the dance. The Hunter Dance performer starts from his local street and goes on performing to the various locations of the Sirsi town overnight. The concluding part of the dance will be at the Shri Marikamba Temple. The dancer performs at his complete rage there. He again starts performing in the other locations of the Sirsi town till the daylight.

There are multiple performers. Each area there will be one person who will represent and dance throughout the city. There are some designated place where the dance will be in full form and each performers will visit those designated place once. It is also said that one dancer isn’t supposed to look at the other face to face.

Popular places where it can be found
Bedara Vesha is performed in the Sirsi town of Karnataka. Another folk dance called ‘Dollu Kunitha’ is also performed during Bedara Vesha.

Modern form
Nearly 50 solo artists’ perform the hunter dance with whistle blowers and a troupe of drum beaters. In modern times various performances will be going on the streets along with The Hunter Dance. The Hunter Dance event is a enjoyable night out for the youngsters of the town. In recent years(2019) Hunter Dance organisers will also bring DJ to the streets, and the whole Sirsi town have got a club like look in the recent times to entertain the viewers more.

References

Holi
Carnivals in India
Folk dances of Karnataka